Worksoft, Inc. is a software testing company founded in 1998 and headquartered in Addison, Texas. The company provides an automation platform for test automation, business process discovery, and documentation supporting enterprise applications, including packaged and web apps.

In addition to its headquarters in Addison, Texas, the company has offices in London and Munich.

History 

Worksoft was founded in 1998 as a software company with a unique automated functional testing framework. Texas-based Austin Ventures and California-based Crecendo Ventures are major investors. In 2010, Worksoft acquired TestFactory, a software testing company specializing in SAP. In 2019, it was acquired by Marlin Equity Partners for an undisclosed sum.

Products 
Worksoft Certify is a test automation platform focused on business process testing. Worksoft Certify can be used to test ERP applications, web apps, mobile apps, and more. The software is SAP certified for integration with SAP applications.

Other products include: Worksoft Certify, Worksoft Analyze, Worksoft Business Reporting Tool (BPP), Worksoft Execution Suite, and Process Capture 2.0.

References 

Software companies established in 1998
1998 establishments in Texas
Software testing
Companies based in Addison, Texas